The Departmental Council of Meurthe-et-Moselle is the deliberative assembly of the French department of Meurthe-et-Moselle. It sits in the former Sédillot military hospital in Nancy.

Composition 

The departmental council of Meurthe-et-Moselle includes 46 departmental councilors elected from the 23 cantons of Meurthe-et-Moselle.

Executive

President 
On 1 July 2021, Chaynesse Khirouni was elected president of the departmental council, winning against Valérie Beausert-Leick.

Vice-presidents 
In addition to the president, the executive has 13 vice-presidents.

References 

Meurthe-et-Moselle
Meurthe-et-Moselle
Politics of Grand Est